The Microlino is a proposed all-electric lightweight four-wheeled quadracycle marketed by Micro Mobility Systems, designed for urban mobility. Noted for its front-opening door recalling the bubble cars from the late 1950s, the Microlino has two seats, a trunk, a folding sunroof and can be charged with either a household or a type 2 plug. 

The Microlino is designed as a lightweight quadricycle (L7e), to combine aspects of a car and motorcycle. Due to its engineering approach, the Microlino has 50% fewer parts than a typical automobile and weighs 513 kilograms.

Six years after a debut at the Geneva Motor Show, the company's lawsuit over a copycat manufacturer, and an extensive redesign, a special introductory edition was projected for manufacture in mid-2022 at the company's factory in Turin.

Overview
Micro Mobility Systems debuted the Microlino at the 86th Geneva Motor Show in 2016. The vehicle was developed together with the Zurich University of Applied Sciences. The idea for the Microlino originated from Wim, Oliver, and Merlin Ouboter, the Swiss family behind the Micro Kickscooter.

They designed a vehicle for space-saving and efficient urban mobility. The Microlino is designed to be small and manoeuvrable like a motorcycle, while offering weather protection. The design recalls 1950s Isetta bubble cars.

The Microlino was also inspired by the Iso Isetta of 1953. Like the Isetta, the Microlino features a single front door to access its interior, which is designed for two people, and a tailgate that opens to a cargo area of 230 liters (8 cubic feet).

Concepts
The Microlino Lite and Microlino Spiaggina are two concepts presented at the 2022 Paris Motor Show that preview future production models.

Production
In 2019 a collaboration between Microlino and Cecomp, an Italian automotive company established in 1978, was started in order to refine both the design as well as the engineering of the Microlino 1.0 to the more modern Microlino 2.0. Cecomp is also the manufacturing partner for series production.

See also
 Three-wheeler
 Concept car
 Nobe GT100
 Isetta

References

Electric cars
Cars introduced in 2016
Production electric cars
Microcars